Geumbak is a Korean traditional craft for applying extremely thin gold leaf on hanbok, or other fabrics for decoration. Artisans who specialize in the technique are called geumbakjang (금박장). 

Kim Deokhwan (김덕환, 金德煥) has been designated as a Living National Treasure as holder of Important Intangible Cultural Property No. 119.

Gallery

References

External links

 www.kumbak.co.kr

Korean art
Gold
Korean clothing
Important Intangible Cultural Properties of South Korea